The Clemson Tigers men's basketball teams of 1960–1969 represented Clemson University in NCAA college basketball competition.

1959–60

1960–61

1961–62

1962–63

1963–64

1964–65

1965–66

1966–67

1967–68

1968–69

Littlejohn Coliseum was opened with a win over Georgia Tech.

References

Games: 
Coaches: 

1960